John Connor (1914 – 1978) was an English footballer, who played as a full back in the Football League for Bolton Wanderers and Tranmere Rovers.

References

External links

Tranmere Rovers F.C. players
Mossley A.F.C. players
Bolton Wanderers F.C. players
Association football fullbacks
English Football League players
1914 births
1978 deaths
English footballers